Highland Township is one of seventeen townships in Grundy County, Illinois, USA.  As of the 2010 census, its population was 288 and it contained 129 housing units.

Geography

Cities, towns, villages
 Kinsman

Extinct towns
 Highland Town at 
(These towns are listed as "historical" by the USGS.)

Demographics

Political districts
 Illinois' 11th congressional district
 State House District 75
 State Senate District 38

References
 
 United States Census Bureau 2007 TIGER/Line Shapefiles
 United States National Atlas

External links
 City-Data.com
 Illinois State Archives

Townships in Grundy County, Illinois
Townships in Illinois
1849 establishments in Illinois